Benjamin Claxton (born July 30, 1980 in Dublin, Georgia) is a former American football center. He was drafted by the Denver Broncos in the fifth round of the 2003 NFL Draft. He played college football at Mississippi.

Claxton has also been a member of the Cleveland Browns, Miami Dolphins, Tampa Bay Buccaneers, Pittsburgh Steelers, Atlanta Falcons, Oakland Raiders, Seattle Seahawks, Detroit Lions, and Arizona Cardinals.

Professional career

Seattle Seahawks
In August 2008, Claxton was preparing to take the LSAT when he scheduled a workout with the New England Patriots. By the time he arrived, the team had already signed someone else. His agent informed him that the Seattle Seahawks were interested, and after a workout the team signed him on August 3.

References

External links
Arizona Cardinals bio
Oakland Raiders bio

Players of American football from Georgia (U.S. state)
American football centers
American football offensive guards
Ole Miss Rebels football players
Denver Broncos players
Cleveland Browns players
Miami Dolphins players
Tampa Bay Buccaneers players
Berlin Thunder players
Pittsburgh Steelers players
Atlanta Falcons players
Oakland Raiders players
Seattle Seahawks players
Detroit Lions players
Arizona Cardinals players
1980 births
Living people
People from Dublin, Georgia